Joseph M. Streett (February 8, 1838 – September 24, 1921) was an American politician and newspaper editor from Maryland. He served as a member of the Maryland House of Delegates, representing Harford County from 1870 to 1872.

Early life
Joseph M. Streett was born on February 8, 1838, in Harford County, Maryland. He was the grandson of John A. Streett, who commanded the Harford calvary at the Battle of North Point. Streett graduated from Princeton University in 1858.

Career
Streett was the editor of the Harford Democrat (later the Democrat and Enterprise) for 50 years. He bought out the Harford Dispatch in 1897. His son Gover also worked with him. He was the first president of the Maryland Editorial Association.

Streett was a Democrat. He served as a member of the Maryland House of Delegates, representing Harford County from 1870 to 1872.

Personal life
Streett married Juliet Evans Gover in 1856. She died in 1907. They had one son and four daughters, Gover G., Elizabeth (married Frank H. Jacobs), Mrs. Robert F. Page, Juliett Gover (married William J. Price) and Mabel Malcolm (married Swepson Earle).

Streett died on September 24, 1921, at his home in Bel Air.

References

1838 births
1921 deaths
People from Harford County, Maryland
Princeton University alumni
Democratic Party members of the Maryland House of Delegates
Editors of Maryland newspapers
19th-century American politicians
19th-century American newspaper editors
20th-century American newspaper editors